The 2011 Aberto Santa Catarina de Tenis was a professional tennis tournament played on clay courts. It was the sixth edition of the tournament which was part of the 2011 ATP Challenger Tour. It took place in Blumenau, Brazil between 11 and 17 April 2011.

ATP entrants

Seeds

 Rankings are as of April 4, 2011.

Other entrants
The following players received wildcards into the singles main draw:
  Marcelo Demoliner
  Thiago Moura Monteiro
  Thales Turini
  Bruno Volkmann

The following entrant has been granted a Special Exemption into the main draw:
  Tiago Fernandes
  Javier Martí

The following players received entry from the qualifying draw:
  Martín Alund
  Aljaž Bedene
  André Ghem
  Martín Vassallo Argüello

Champions

Singles

 José Acasuso def.  Marcelo Demoliner, 6–2, 6–2

Doubles

 Franco Ferreiro /  André Sá def.  Adrián Menéndez /  Leonardo Tavares, 6–2, 3–6, [10–4]

References
ITF search
ATP official site

Aberto Santa Catarina de Tenis
Clay court tennis tournaments
2011
Aberto Santa Catarina de Tenis
Aberto Santa Catarina de Tenis